Irrua Specialist Teaching Hospital is a federal government of Nigeria teaching hospital located in Irrua, Edo State, Nigeria. The current Chief Medical Director is Professor Reuben .A. Eifediyi.The purpose of  Irrua specialist Teaching Hospital(ISTH) is to become a Centre of Excellence in Teaching, Research and Service to various health problems facing the rural and suburban/small urban town communities. Their aim is to manage and control viral hemorrhagic fevers, with special reference to Lassa Fever.

Irrua specialist teaching hospital is also established to provide specialized, affordable, accessible and qualitative promotive, preventive and curative health care services for patients.

History
Irrua Specialist Teaching Hospital was established by decree 92 of 1993 (Appendix I). The hospital was formerly known as Otibhor Okae Teaching Hospital.

CMD
The current Chief Medical Director is Professor Reuben.A Eifediyi.

References

University of Nigeria
Teaching hospitals in Nigeria